The 1926 Oklahoma A&M Cowboys football team represented Oklahoma A&M College—now known as Oklahoma State University–Stillwater—as a member of the Missouri Valley Conference during the 1926 college football season. Led by sixth-year head coach John Maulbetsch, the Cowboys compiled an overall record of 3–4–1 with a mark of 3–0–1in conference play, winning the MVC title. Oklahoma A&M played home games at Lewis Field in Stillwater, Oklahoma.

Schedule

References

Oklahoma AandM
Oklahoma State Cowboys football seasons
Missouri Valley Conference football champion seasons
Oklahoma AandM